EP 2 is the second EP released by British downtempo duo Zero 7.

Track listing

External links
[ EP 2 at Allmusic]

2000 EPs
Zero 7 albums